Bear Creek Township is one of twenty-four townships in Hancock County, Illinois, USA.  As of the 2010 census, its population was 345 and it contained 165 housing units.

Vinyard History

In the 1860s and 1870s, the grapes grown in Bear Creek at the vineyard of Gabriel Morlot were well known in the state.  They won first place at the 17th Annual Illinois State Fair in 1869 in the categories of "Best Two Bottles of Catawba, Product of this State", "Best Two Bottles of Clinton, Product of this State", and "Best Two Bottles of Concord, Product of this State", earning three silver medals.

Geography

Cities, towns, villages
 Basco

Cemeteries
The township contains these four cemeteries: Bethel, Graham, South Basco and West Basco.

Cozart Cemetery is located south of Elvastan in the middle of a field now farmed by the Geissler Brothers. This cemetery is timed in the 19th century and is also the resting place for Alexander K. Patterson, one of four war veterans buried in Handcock

Demographics

School districts
 Hamilton Community Consolidated School District 328
 Southeastern Community Unit School District 337
 Warsaw Community Unit School District 316

Political districts
 Illinois's 18th congressional district
 State House District 94
 State Senate District 47

References
 United States Census Bureau 2008 TIGER/Line Shapefiles
 
 United States National Atlas

External links
 City-Data.com
 Illinois State Archives
 Township Officials of Illinois

Townships in Hancock County, Illinois
Townships in Illinois